The Armista Apartments, known also as the Waldorf Apartments, at 555 East 100 South in Salt Lake City, Utah, United States were built in 1927. They were listed on the National Register of Historic Places in 1989.

The building is significant as representing the urbanization of Salt Lake City during 1890–1930, a period in which more than 180 "urban apartments" (apartment buildings) were built. Urban apartments were a new and important type of housing, that "document[ed] the accommodation of builders and residents to the realities of crowded living conditions and high land values", as opposed to suburban style architecture that would signify denial of urbanization.

The apartment building was built for about $80,000 and its apartments were advertised as "'Splendid 3-room apartments, equipped with electric ranges and electric refrigeration. $40.00 to $42.00. One of the most modernly equipped and conveniently located apartments in the city.'"

The apartments were renovated in 2007.

See also
 
 National Register of Historic Places listings in Salt Lake City

References

External links
 

1927 establishments in Utah
Residential skyscrapers in Salt Lake City
Colonial Revival architecture in Utah
National Register of Historic Places in Salt Lake City
Residential buildings completed in 1927
Residential buildings on the National Register of Historic Places in Utah